The Ombudsman for Children in Sweden (abbreviated BO) is a Swedish government agency organized under the Ministry of Health and Social Affairs tasked with public advocacy and the dissemination of information about the rights and needs of children and young people. The Ombudsman should represent children regarding their rights and interests on the basis of the UN Convention on the Rights of the Child (CRC). The Ombudsman has legal authority to request information and to summon representatives from the municipalities, counties and other authorities to talks, but hold no regulatory powers. There's no government mandate to focus or issue an opinion on individual cases. However, the Ombudsman has a legal duty of notification, meaning they are required by law to report to the local social services, whenever they become aware of an abused child.

The Ombudsman holds regular dialogues with children, especially those in vulnerable situations, to obtain knowledge of their conditions and their opinions. The agency report back to the government once a year, and the report consists of a magazine, usually with a specific theme; with additional information presented on the Ombudsman's website.

History
In 1990 the Riksdag ratified the CRC. Sweden was thereby committed under international law to implement the Convention, and around the same time the Government appointed a Commission of inquiry to examine the issue of appointing an Ombudsman for Children. In 1993, the Riksdag finally approved the appointment of an Ombudsman, and The Ombudsman for Children's Act (1993:335) came into effect on July 1.

List of Ombudsmen for Children
Over the years, the following people served as the ombudsman:

 Louise Sylwander, 1993-2001
 Lena Nyberg, 2001-2008
 Fredrik Malmberg, 2008-2017
 Anita Wickström, acting, 2017
 Anna Karin Hildingson Boqvist, acting, 2018
 Elisabeth Dahlin, 2018–

See also
 Ombudsman
 Children's Ombudsman

References

External links
The Ombudsman for Children in Sweden – Official website (English)
English translation of The Ombudsman for Children's Act

Government agencies of Sweden
 Children's
Sweden
Children's rights instruments
Child welfare in Sweden